(Swift, swift, you swirling winds), BWV 201, is a secular cantata by Johann Sebastian Bach, on a libretto by Picander (pen name of Christian Friedrich Henrici). It is a dramma per musica, likely composed for a public performance in 1729, around which time its oldest extant printed libretto was published. The text, titled  (The Contest between Phoebus and Pan), is based on the "Ears of a Donkey" story in Ovid's Metamorphoses, and mocks unsophisticated music in favour of a more intelligent composition style.

The music is scored for SATTBB singers, and a baroque orchestra which includes trumpets, timpani, traversos, oboes, strings and continuo. The cantata has been recorded several times from the 1950s to the 21st century.

History 
 was likely composed for Leipzig's autumn fair of 1729, or, in that year, for a weekly concert outside the periods of Leipzig's fairs. Its oldest extant separately printed libretto, which can not be dated exactly, was published around this time, its full title being  (The Contest between Phoebus and Pan performed as a drama by J. S. Bach). Likely the work was first performed in Zimmermann's coffeehouse or coffee garden by the Collegium Musicum that had come under Bach's direction in March 1729.

According to Philipp Spitta, the cantata is part of the early stages of the controversy between Bach and Johann Adolph Scheibe. That controversy, best known for the polemic that followed Scheibe's publication of a criticism of Bach in 1737, would have had its origin in Scheibe's failed attempt to become an organist at one of Leipzig's churches in 1729, where Bach had been one of the judges who preferred another candidate above Scheibe. In that version of the events, Phoebus would have been a character representing Bach, while Midas represented Scheibe. This interpretation by Spitta was later doubted: an analysis published by Arnold Schering in 1941 showed that Spitta had some of the facts wrong. For instance, Scheibe was competing for a different position than the one described by Spitta. More importantly, in 1731 Bach wrote a very favourable letter of recommendation to help Scheibe get an assignment, so it seems unlikely he would have been mocking Scheibe in his 1729 cantata.

Picander included a print of the cantata's libretto in the 1732 third volume of his . In the publication, the text incipit reads Geschwinde, ihr wirbelnden Winde (Swift, you swirling winds). The work appears to have been performed again in Leipzig in the 1730s. Bach's sons Johann Christian and Johann Christoph Friedrich produced a handwritten copy of the cantata's libretto in 1749, which indicates a repeat performance of the work in that year. This version of the libretto contains a few text adaptations which seem to indicate that Bach made the cantata applicable to a controversy which his student (and later successor) Johann Friedrich Doles, then living in Freiberg, was subjected to by his superior, .

Plot, scoring and structure 
The plot of The Contest between Phoebus and Pan, BWV 201, is based on the "Ears of a Donkey" part of Midas's story, as found in the eleventh book of Ovid's Metamorphoses. In the ancient story there is an interaction of four characters: Pan, playing a pan flute, and Apollo (a.k.a. Phoebus), playing a lyre (or: cithara), have a musical contest of which the mountain god Tmolus is the arbiter. Tmolus decides in favour of the charming melody produced by Apollo, a judgement which is contested by Midas, who prefers Pan's rustic sounds. Tmolus punishes Midas for his stupidity by turning his ears into the ears of a donkey. In Picander's libretto there are two additional characters: Mercury, god of commerce, and Momus, god of mockery. Both Mercury and Apollo were symbolical representations of Leipzig: Mercury of its business aspect (exemplified e.g. by its fairs), and Apollo of its learning (exemplified e.g. by its university).

The work has six arias, one for each of the six characters. Bucolic arias (Momus, Pan, Midas) alternate with lyrical ones (Phoebus, Tmolus, Mercury). Each aria is preceded and followed by a recitative, which gives a total of seven recitatives. In the opening and closing movements all six voices of the characters sing as a chorus. Together with these two movements the total number of movements is 15.

The orchestral accompaniment consists of three trumpets (TrI, TrII, TrIII), timpani (Ti), two traversos (TraI, TraII), two oboes (ObI, ObII), oboe d'amore (Oba), strings (Str) and basso continuo, which plays throughout. The string section consists of first violins (VnI), second violins (VnII) and a part for viola(s) (Va). All the instruments, except the oboe d'amore, join in the initial and final  choruses.

In the opening chorus, the winds are summoned to recede, so that an environment without background noise will make the sounds of what will follow clearer, and make an unhampered echo possible. The first recitative starts with Phoebus disputing that Pan's song would excel his own, and Pan boasting about his own musical qualities. Momus starts to mock Pan, and continues to do so in his ensuing aria. In the second recitative, Mercury suggests that the two contestants each choose a judge, so Tmolus and Midas are chosen by Phoebus and Pan respectively. Then Mercury bids to give attention, after which Apollo sings his aria, a love song to Hyacinth. In the recitative following that aria Momus invites Pan to step up: Pan obliges and sings his dance aria, employing some of the effects customary in comic opera – the over-all effect of the aria being a musical joke. Bach later re-used the music of this aria in the Peasant Cantata. Bach's music does not refer to the instruments associated with Phoebus and Pan in their respective arias, i.e. a lute-like instrument for Apollo and some sort of flute for Pan.

In the fourth recitative, Mercury invites the judges to speak out: Tmolus begins, and sings an aria in favour of Apollo. Then Pan invites Midas to do the same, who, in his aria, declares Pan to be the victor. Where Midas sings about his ears, an instrumental donkey's bray resounds, prefiguring his punishment. Then follows a recitative in which all singers participate: Momus, Mercury, Tmolus and Phoebus reproach Midas his ill judgement. After a short plea for mercy, Phoebus and Mercury punish him with the ears of an ass. After Pan's and Midas's retorts Mercury sings his aria about whom earned the fool's cap. The last recitative is for Momus, who sends Midas to the woods, declaring he belongs in the company of those who judge too quickly, and invites Phoebus to song. The final chorus praises the sounds of strings, as belonging to the gods.

Recordings 
J.S. Bach: Cantata BWV 201, Schwäbischer Singkreis Stuttgart / Ton-Studio Orchestra Stuttgart  (1952)
J.S. Bach: Kantate Nr. 201, Thomanerchor Leipzig / Gewandhausorchester Leipzig (1953)
J.S. Bach: Cantata BWV 201, Moscow Conservatoire Chamber Orchestra (1987)
J.S. Bach: Cantate Profanes, RIAS-Kammerchor / Akademie für Alte Musik Berlin / René Jacobs (Harmonia Mundi, 1995)
J.S. Bach: Secular Cantatas, Musica Antiqua Köln / Reinhard Goebel (Archiv, 1997)
Bach: Complete Cantatas, Vol. 4, Amsterdam Baroque Orchestra & Choir / Ton Koopman (Erato, 1997)
J.S. Bach: Secular Cantatas, Vol. 9, Bach Collegium Japan / Masaaki Suzuki (BIS, 2017)

References

Sources

External links 

 

Secular cantatas by Johann Sebastian Bach
1729 compositions